The Ligue de football de la Martinique is the governing body of football in Martinique.  It is associated with the French Football Federation, but is independently as a member of CONCACAF.

See also
Martinique Championnat National
Martinique national football team

References

External links
 Official site
 Martinique at CONCACAF site

Martinique
Football in Martinique
Mart
Sports organizations established in 1953
1953 establishments in Martinique